Lakshmi Krishnamurti (1 August 1925 – 14 June 2009) was an Indian author and politician. She is the daughter of Indian independence activist S. Satyamurti.

Early life 

Lakshmi Krishnamurti was born on 1 August 1925. in Madras, British India. Her father S. Satyamurti was one of the leading politicians of the Swaraj Party at that time. While in the General Hospital in Madras and in The Penitentiary in Madras, Satyamurti wrote a series of letters to his daughter.  These letters can be found in the book "At the threshold of life"

Political career 

Lakshmi was a member of the Indian National Congress in her early days though she did not actively associate herself with the organisation. In 1964, K. Kamaraj nominated her to the Madras Legislative Council. As member of the council, Lakshmi championed educational reforms and was member of the committee which regularised private colleges.

During the Emergency 

Lakshmi played a more active political role during the Indian Emergency of 1975 and was jailed by Indira Gandhi. She co-founded the Janata Party and unsuccessfully contested from Mylapore in the 1977 Legislative Assembly election.

Later years

In her later years, Lakshmi wrote a biography of her father, The Satyamurti Letters which is considered to be the most authoritative book on the leader. She also founded the Satyamurti Centre for Democratic Studies on the occasion of Satyamurti's birth centenary in 1987. Lakshmi died on 14 June 2009 after a brief illness. She was 83.

Notes 

1925 births
2009 deaths
Politicians from Chennai
Writers from Chennai
Indian National Congress politicians from Tamil Nadu
Indian women non-fiction writers
Women biographers
20th-century Indian biographers
Women in Tamil Nadu politics
20th-century Indian women writers
Women writers from Tamil Nadu
20th-century Indian women politicians
20th-century Indian politicians